Bítov is a municipality and village in Znojmo District in the South Moravian Region of the Czech Republic. It has about 100 inhabitants.

History

The first written mention of Bítov is in the foundation deed of the Stará Boleslav Chapter from 1046. History of the village is connected with the Bítov Castle, which was first mentioned in a deed from the 1060s.

Sights
Bítov is known for the Bítov Castle, one of the oldest castles in the country. It was probably founded by Bretislav I before 1055. Today it is owned by the state and offers sightseeing tours.

References

External links

Villages in Znojmo District